Carlos Eduardo Fernandes Vieira de Andrade (born April 27, 1978) is a former Portuguese basketball player who played as a small forward.

Andrade played college basketball in the United States, and had brief spells in Germany and Spain. He is the younger brother of former WNBA player, Mery Andrade, who competed for the Cleveland Rockers and the Charlotte Sting.

Career
Born Sal, Cape Verde, Andrade started playing as a 16-year-old in basketball division of telecommunications company, Portugal Telecom, before he moved to the United States to play in the NCAA with the Queens University on 4 June 1999.

At Queens University, Andrade made part of the team that reach three consecutive Elite Eight finals, being nominated for Conference All-Tournament award in 2001-02, He left as Queens’ All-time Leading Rebounder, with 755, a record surpassed in 2006 by Kendrick Harris.

In 2003, he returned to Portugal, and joined FC Porto, making part of a squad that conquered four titles in one season. The 26-year-old then moved to C.A. Queluz and helped the team win its first league title in 21 years, while also debuting in European competitions, averaging 13.1 points per game in the 2004–05 ULEB Cup.

In 2006, Andrade made his first venture in European basketball, when he joined Skyliners Frankfurt in the Bundesliga, finishing in 14th place with the Frankfurt team, and playing another year in the ULEB Cup, with averages of 7.2 points per game.

He returned to Portugal for one season to compete for S.L. Benfica, before his second European adventure in two years, joining San Sebastián Gipuzkoa BC on 18 July 2007, helping the Basque team win the 2005–06 LEB season, and achieve a 12th place in the 2008–09 ACB season.

On 1 September 2009, the 31-year-old, rejoin Porto for a second time, winning a Portuguese Cup in his first season, and the league title in his second. With his contract with the Porto expired; on 3 August 2012, Andrade traded Porto for Benfica, and became an important part of the team, winning four league titles and 17 other conquests, as the club return to European basket in the 2014–15 EuroChallenge. He retire at the end of 2017–18, at age 40.

Honours
Porto
Portuguese Basketball League (LCB): 2003–04, 2010–11
Portuguese Cup: 2003–04, 2009–10. 2011-12
Portuguese Basketball Super Cup: 2004, 2010, 2011
League Cup: 2003–04, 2009-10, 2011-12
António Pratas Trophy: 2011

Queluz
Portuguese Basketball League (LCB): 2004–05
Portuguese Cup: 2004–05
Portuguese Basketball Super Cup: 2005

Benfica
Portuguese Basketball League (LCB): 2012–13, 2013–14, 2014–15, 2016–17
Portuguese Cup: 2013–14, 2014–15, 2015–16, 2016–17
Portuguese Basketball Super Cup: 2012, 2013, 2014, 2015, 2017
League Cup: 2012–13, 2013–14, 2014–15, 2016–17, 2017–18
António Pratas Trophy: 2013, 2015, 2016

References

External links
 Eurobasket Profile
 ACB.com Profile 

1978 births
Living people
Cape Verdean men's basketball players
People from Sal, Cape Verde
FC Porto basketball players
Gipuzkoa Basket players
Liga ACB players
Portuguese sportspeople of Cape Verdean descent
Portuguese men's basketball players
Queens Royals men's basketball players
S.L. Benfica basketball players
Small forwards
Portuguese people of Cape Verdean descent